Wallace Todd Kersten (born December 8, 1959) is a former American football tackle. He played for the Los Angeles Rams in 1982.

References

1959 births
Living people
American football tackles
Minnesota Golden Gophers football players
Los Angeles Rams players
Roosevelt High School (Minnesota) alumni